In enzymology, a D-amino-acid N-acetyltransferase is an enzyme that catalyzes the chemical reaction

acetyl-CoA + a D-amino acid  CoA + an N-acetyl-D-amino acid

Thus, the two substrates of this enzyme are acetyl-CoA and D-amino acid, whereas its two products are CoA and N-acetyl-D-amino acid.

This enzyme belongs to the family of transferases, specifically those acyltransferases transferring groups other than aminoacyl groups.  The systematic name of this enzyme class is acetyl-CoA:D-amino-acid N-acetyltransferase. Other names in common use include D-amino acid acetyltransferase, and D-amino acid-alpha-N-acetyltransferase.  This enzyme participates in phenylalanine metabolism.

References

 

EC 2.3.1
Enzymes of unknown structure